

The MAC Mamba, Mamba Range is an Australian two-seat light aircraft designed and built by the Melbourne Aircraft Corporation.

Design and development
The Mamba is a strut-braced, high-wing monoplane designed over two years and first flown on 25 January 1989. It has fixed tricycle landing gear and is powered by a  Lycoming O-235 flat-four piston engine. It has an enclosed glazed cabin with side-by-side configuration seating for two. The fuselage is constructed of welded steel tubing with stressed aluminum skin. It was intended to introduce four-seat and military versions of the Mamba.

The military version was built under contract by Australian Aircraft Industries as the AA-2S Mamba powered by an IO-360.

Variants
AA-2
Lycoming O-235-powered prototype built by Melbourne Aircraft Corporation
AA-2M 
Lycoming IO-360-powered military variant built by Australian Aircraft Industries
AA-2S
Lycoming IO-360-powered civilian under test by Mamba Aircraft Company
AA-4S
Lycoming O-320 four-place under development by Mamba Aircraft Company

Specifications (Prototype)

See also

References

Notes

Bibliography

1990s Australian civil utility aircraft
High-wing aircraft
Single-engined tractor aircraft
Mamba